TVNI (TV Norfolk Island) is a television channel on Norfolk Island broadcasting advertisements for local businesses and tourist information. It is the only terrestrial television channel native on Norfolk Island, the Island is also served by satellite television from the Australian mainland.

See also
 Dan Widdowson, operator, 2011 to 2013

References

External links
 TV Norfolk Island (archived site)
 TVNI on YouTube

Norfolk Island culture
Communications in Norfolk Island
Television stations in Australia
Television channels and stations established in 1992
1992 establishments in Australia